The Syrian Arab Handball Federation (SAHF) is the administrative and controlling body for handball in Syrian Arab Republic. SAHF is a member of the Asian Handball Federation (AHF) and member of the International Handball Federation (IHF) since 1962.

National teams
 Syria men's national handball team
 Syria men's national junior handball team
 Syria men's national youth handball team
 Syria women's national handball team

Competitions hosted
 1994 Asian Men's Junior Handball Championship
 1988 Asian Men's Junior Handball Championship

References

External links
 Syria at the IHF website.
 Syria at the AHF website.

Sports organizations established in 1961
1961 establishments in Syria
Handball governing bodies
Handball in Syria
Sports governing bodies in Syria
Asian Handball Federation
National members of the International Handball Federation